The Satellite Sisters is an internet–based podcast. Previously, the show was a syndicated radio program heard on Public Radio International and ABC News & Talk (via ABC Radio Networks). The program began on Public Radio International in 2000; a year after its launch, it was syndicated on 70 radio stations.  The show revolves around five real-life sisters living in different cities. Its premise is: the sisters "get together" via satellite to talk as if they were going to meet in person or talk on the phone.   Typically, the sisters rotate which days they host the show, and usually the show is co-hosted by three of the five sisters simultaneously.

The show has received 13 Gracie Awards for excellence from American Women in Radio and Television.

ABC Radio ceased syndication of the show on November 9, 2008, and show transformed into an internet-based podcast, with three new shows posted per week.

In addition to the radio show/podcast, the Sisters have written a book called UnCommon Senses.  Published by Riverhead Books in 2001, the book is short stories about the Dolan sisters' lives growing up in Fairfield, CT. The sisters bring the chapters/stories to life by posting podcast readings. The Satellite Sisters released a second book called You're the Best: A Celebration of Friendship in October 2015, published by Prospect Park Books.

There is also an internet community radio station named BSIDE Radio in Vancouver BC Canada,  that hosts a Radio program that also is hosted as a podcast called Satellite Sisters on Bside Radio. This program/podcast showcases "Bassmusic" tracks produced by women and plays a mixed set by a woman DJ in every episode. (Women and non binary people/trans women).

The Sisters

Julie Dolan 
Julie Dolan Smith is the oldest of the sisters. She is the one "true" satellite sister as she is a "trailing spouse".  Among other things, she has held the position of Dean of College Admissions. Until September 2006, Julie lived in Russia and would broadcast the show from overseas.  After a short stay in San Francisco, she and her husband moved to Steamboat Springs, Colorado, and then relocated to Dallas, Texas. She has two grown sons.  She is also the first of the sisters to become a grandmother. Prior to moving overseas, she had a successful career in academic university administration.

Liz Dolan
Liz Dolan is the second-oldest of the sisters. Liz is a 1979 graduate of Brown University.  She is a former corporate vice-president at the Nike Corporation. She played a major role in the development of the Satellite Sisters show. In January 2009 she was named Chief Marketing Officer for "OWN", The Oprah Winfrey Network based in Burbank, Ca. She then worked at Fox International as the Chief Marketing Officer. Liz resides in Santa Monica, California with her dog Hooper.

Sheila Dolan
Sheila Dolan is the middle sister. She has spent the bulk of her career in education including stints as a teacher and principal in New York City. Sheila is based in Santa Monica, California in what she refers to as "The Cozy Cottage."  She has one grown daughter, Ruthie. She is often the sister who assumes the "lead" on the radio program.  In a recent show, Sheila stated that she often would go into public places wearing pajama bottoms.

Monica Dolan
Monica Dolan is the second-youngest sister. She is based in Portland, Oregon and broadcasts from her home there.  Prior to joining the show, Monica spent the bulk of her career as a nurse. Monica has a segment which spotlights fun indie bands or artists.  This is segment exposes listeners to new sounds.

Lian Dolan
Lian Dolan is the youngest sister. Lian Dolan is a writer, producer and podcaster.  In addition to hosting and producing Satellite Sisters, Lian is the author of three novels: The Sweeney Sisters, was published by William Morrow/Harper Collins in April 2020 and two  novels, Helen of Pasadena and Elizabeth the First Wife, both published by Prospect Park Books. She has written regularly for Working Mother Magazine,  O, The Oprah Magazine and Pasadena Magazine.  She graduated from Pomona College in Claremont, California with a degree in Classics. She lives in Pasadena with her husband, two grown sons and one big German shepherd.https://satellitesisters.com/about-lian-liz-and-julie-dolan/

Learn more: LianDolan.com

Critical reaction
June Casagrande said: "The Satellite Sisters are also cool women — the kind of people I'd like to hang out with".

UnCommon Senses
Their book Satellite Sisters' Uncommon Senses was published in 2001. People criticized it as "excessively navel-gazing". Publishers Weekly felt it worked better on the radio than on the page and found "nothing wildly entertaining or groundbreaking" in the book.

References

American radio programs